The 1961–62 season was Fussball Club Basel 1893's 68th season in their existence. It was their 16th consecutive season in the top flight of Swiss football following their promotion from the Nationalliga B the season 1945–46. They played their home games in the Landhof, in the Wettstein Quarter in Kleinbasel. Ernst Weber was the club's chairman for the third consecutive season.

Overview

Pre-season
The former Czechoslovak footballer Jiří Sobotka was appointed as Basel's new team manager. Sobotka had been manager for La Chaux-de-Fonds from 1946 to 1959 and during this time had won the championship twice and the cup competition five times. He was manager for Feyenoord from 1959 to 1961 and had won the Dutch League with them in the season before he was hired by Basel. A number of older players left the squad. But quite a few new youngster were brought in to cover these empty places and Sobotka was well known for his work with the younger players. In fact all the new youngsters that joined the club lived within just a few minutes bus or tram ride from the Landhof stadium: Heinz Blumer lived in Reinach and advanced up from the junior team, local man Peter Füri joined the club from La Chaux-de-Fonds,  Markus Pfirter joined from Concordia Basel, Otto Ludwig returned from Old Boys, Roland Denicola lived in Allschwil, René Burri in Birsfelden, Wilfried Fritz in Kandern and Hans-Ruedi Günthardt lived in Basel.

Basel played a total of 44 games this season. Of these 44 matches 26 were in the domestic league, four were in the Swiss Cup, six were in the newly formed International Football Cup and eight were friendly matches. Of these eight friendly games four were played at home and four away from home. Four games ended in a victory, three were drawn and one ended in a defeat. The friendly match against 1. FC Köln at the end of the season was one of the highlights of these test games, it ended in a 4–4 draw. This was the farewell game for Josef Hügi who was moving on to play for Zürich the following season. René Burri, Roberto Frigerio twice and Hügi himself scored the goals for Basel. Karl-Heinz Thielen, Christian Müller, Breuer and Helmut Benthaus scored the goals for Köln. 14,000 spectators paid their entrance tickets to see the game, much needed money because the club was suffering under a bad financial situation at that time. An interesting point to note was the contact that was made between the club's chairman, Ernst Weber, and the scorer of the final goal of the match, Benthaus. This contact would come in handy a few years later.

International Football Cup
Basel were appointed as one of four Swiss representatives in the newly founded IFC. The  1961–62 International Football Cup took place during the summer break. Basel played in Group B4 together with Sparta Rotterdam, IF Elfsborg and SC Tasmania 1900 Berlin but finished the group in the bottom position.

Domestic league
Fourteen teams contested the 1960–61 Nationalliga A, these were the top 12 teams from the previous season and the two newly promoted teams Lugano and Schaffhausen. The Championship was played in a double round-robin, the champions were to be qualified for 1962–63 European Cup and the last two teams in the table were to be relegated. The team played a mediocre season, but not much more was expected from the young team, manager Jiří Sobotka was forming the team for the future seasons. Basel finished the season in the mid-field region of the league table in 7th position with 28 points, 12 points behind Servette who won the championship for the second time in a row. Basel won ten games, drew eight and were defeated eight times. Youngster Markus Pfirter was the team's top league goal scorer with nine goals and oldie Josef Hügi scored eight times that season.

Swiss Cup
Basel entered the Swiss Cup in the third principal round. They were drawn at home against third tier club SR Delémont. Despite being 0–2 in arrear early in the game, they came back to win 3–2. In the fourth round they faced fourth tier local club FC Breite, with ex-FCB player Hans Hügi (who had retired from active football) in another home game. Older brother Hügi (I) defended against younger brother Hügi (II), but younger brother won the duel and scored two of the goals as Basel won 3–0 to continue to the next round. In the fifth round Basel won due to an own goal against Zürich, but in the quarter-final they were defeated by Bellinzona, who continued to the final, but here they were defeated by cup winners Lausanne-Sport after extra time.

Players 
The following is the list of the Basel first team squad during the 1961–62 season. The list includes players that were in the squad on the day that the Nationalliga A season started on 20 August 1961 but subsequently left the club after that date.

 

 

 

 

 

 
 
   

Players who left the squad

Results 
Legend

Friendly matches

Preseason

Winter break and end of season

Nationalliga A

League matches

League table

Swiss Cup

International Football Cup

Group B4 matches

Group table

See also 
 History of FC Basel
 List of FC Basel players
 List of FC Basel seasons

References

Sources 
 Die ersten 125 Jahre. Publisher: Josef Zindel im Friedrich Reinhardt Verlag, Basel. 
 The FCB team 1961–62 at fcb-archiv.ch
 Switzerland 1961–62 by Erik Garin at Rec.Sport.Soccer Statistics Foundation

External links 
 FC Basel official site

FC Basel seasons
Basel